Elizabeth Arnold is an American journalist who was NPR's National Political Correspondent. After 17 years with NPR she returned to Alaska and is a tenured Professor and Chair of the Department of Journalism and Communication at the University of Alaska Anchorage. Among most notable awards, she was honored with the Joan Shorenstein Barone Award from Harvard in 1994, the duPont Columbia Silver Baton in 1994-95 for political coverage, and the 1997 Dirksen Award for distinguished reporting of Congress. She continues to report from Alaska on Arctic issues for NPR and Public Radio International (PRI) and created the website arcticprofiles.com with a grant from the National Park Service. In 2018, Arnold was awarded a fellowship at Harvard's Shorenstein Center on the Press, Politics and Public Policy .

Life
She graduated from Colgate University cum laude.

She was a reporter for KTOO.
She was Washington bureau Correspondent for NPR from 1991 to 2006.

She lives in Anchorage.

References

External links

Elizabeth Arnold at NPR
https://www.uaa.alaska.edu/academics/college-of-arts-and-sciences/departments/journalism-and-communication/arnold.cshtml Elizabeth Arnold] at University of Alaska Anchorage

American reporters and correspondents
NPR personalities
Living people
Year of birth missing (living people)